The 2016 Big Ten Conference men's soccer tournament was the 26th edition of the tournament. It determined the Big Ten Conference's automatic berth into the 2016 NCAA Division I Men's Soccer Championship. Maryland entered the tournament as the defending champions.

The top-seeded Maryland Terrapins won the Big Ten title for a third consecutive year, defeating the third-seed, Wisconsin in the championship match, 2–1. Maryland's D. J. Reeves opened the scoring 90 seconds into the match, while Wisconsin's Tom Barlow tied the game in the 12th minute. Shortly before halftime, Maryland's Sebastian Elney headed in a Jorge Calix cross to give Maryland the 2–1 lead, which would prove to be the final scoreline. It was the first time since Indiana accomplished the feat in 1996, that a team won three consecutive Big Ten tournaments.

The tournament for the first time in its history was not hosted by a university in the conference. Instead, the quarterfinal matches were played at the campus sites of the higher seed, while the semifinal and championship fixtures were played at the Grand Park Sports Complex in Westfield, Indiana, about 10 miles north of downtown Indianapolis.

Seeds
The top four teams participate in the tournament. The seeding is based on the program's conference record during the 2016 Big Ten Conference season.

Bracket

Results

First round

Quarterfinals

Semifinals

Final

See also 
 Big Ten Conference Men's Soccer Tournament
 2016 Big Ten Conference men's soccer season
 2016 NCAA Division I Men's Soccer Championship
 2016 NCAA Division I men's soccer season

References

External links 
Big Ten Tournament Central

Big Ten Men's Soccer Tournament
Big Ten Conference men's tournament
Big Ten Men's Soccer Tournament